Marcus Burk (born September 27, 1997) is an American professional basketball player for the Grand Rapids Gold of the NBA G League. He played college basketball for the Campbell Fighting Camels and the IUPUI Jaguars.

High school career
Burk attended Franklin Central High School, and led the team to four straight sectional titles. As a junior, he averaged 19 points, five rebounds and two assists per game, earning All-Conference honors. He scored 40 points against Columbus East High School. In the Class 4A regional semifinals, Burk posted 36 points, though the Flashes lost to FJ Reitz High School, 81–80. As a senior, he averaged 25.3 points, 5.7 rebounds and 2.7 assists and 2.1 steals per game, earning First Team Super Team honors from The Indianapolis Star. In April 2016, Burk committed to playing college basketball for Campbell, the first Division I school to offer him a scholarship, though he also received interest from Maine, Lincoln Memorial, King, and Saginaw Valley State.

College career
As a freshman at Campbell, Burk averaged 8 points and 2.4 rebounds per game. He was named Big South Player of the Week on November 27, 2017, after scoring 33 points against UNC Wilmington. Burk averaged 14.8 points and 3.6 rebounds per game as a sophomore. Following the season, he transferred to IUPUI. On January 25, 2020, Burk scored a career-high 39 points in an 89–85 overtime win against Oakland. Burk averaged 21.3 points and 3.4 rebounds per game as a junior, earning Second Team All-Horizon League honors. Following the season, he declared for the 2020 NBA draft, but ultimately returned to IUPUI. In the offseason, he focused on losing weight, building muscle, and improving his playmaking. As a senior, Burk averaged 21.7 points, 3.7 rebounds, 2.2 assists and 1.8 steals per game. He was named to the Second Team All-Horizon League.

Professional career
In October 2021, Burk joined the Grand Rapids Gold after a successful tryout.

On August 10, 2022, he has signed with Twarde Pierniki Toruń of the Polish Basketball League (PLK).

Return to Grand Rapids (2023–present)
On January 26, 2023, Burk was reacquired by the Grand Rapids Gold.

Career statistics

College

|-
| style="text-align:left;"| 2016–17
| style="text-align:left;"| Campbell
| 36 || 12 || 20.9 || .429 || .401 || .784 || 2.4 || .8 || .5 || .1 || 8.0
|-
| style="text-align:left;"| 2017–18
| style="text-align:left;"| Campbell
| 33 || 32 || 31.8 || .490 || .403 || .850 || 3.6 || 1.2 || 1.3 || .2 || 14.8
|-
| style="text-align:left;"| 2018–19
| style="text-align:left;"| IUPUI
| style="text-align:center;" colspan="11"|  Redshirt
|-
| style="text-align:left;"| 2019–20
| style="text-align:left;"| IUPUI
| 32 || 32 || 34.8 || .432 || .386 || .782 || 3.4 || 1.9 || 1.2 || .3 || 21.3
|-
| style="text-align:left;"| 2020–21
| style="text-align:left;"| IUPUI
| 18 || 17 || 34.1 || .481 || .409 || .802 || 3.7 || 2.2 || 1.8 || .4 || 21.7
|- class="sortbottom"
| style="text-align:center;" colspan="2"| Career
| 119 || 93 || 29.7 || .456 || .398 || .800 || 3.2 || 1.4 || 1.1 || .2 || 15.5

References

External links
IUPUI Jaguars bio
Campbell Fighting Camels bio

1997 births
Living people
American men's basketball players
Basketball players from Indiana
Campbell Fighting Camels basketball players
Grand Rapids Gold players
IUPUI Jaguars men's basketball players
People from Munster, Indiana
Shooting guards
Twarde Pierniki Toruń players